Robert Pearce (February 29, 1908 – March 15, 1996) was an American wrestler and olympic champion. He competed at the 1932 Olympic Games in Los Angeles, where he won a gold medal in freestyle bantamweight.

Early years
Pearce initially took up wrestling during his youth to strengthen himself physically from a constant struggle with allergies. While in high school in Cushing, Oklahoma, Pearce had three undefeated seasons and won three Oklahoma state championships.

College
Pearce wrestled collegiately at Oklahoma A&M (now called Oklahoma State), helping extend head coach Edward C. Gallagher's winning streak to 70 consecutive matches. Overall, Pearce was 60-4-1, winning the NCAA title in 1931 and finishing as runner-up in 1932.

International
Following his runner-up finish as a senior in 1932, Pearce responded by winning the gold medal at the 1932 Summer Olympics, held in Los Angeles, California. His gold medal in 1932 was the first ever for an Oklahoman wrestler.

In 1981, Pearce was inducted into the National Wrestling Hall of Fame as a Distinguished Member.

References

1908 births
1996 deaths
Wrestlers at the 1932 Summer Olympics
American male sport wrestlers
Olympic gold medalists for the United States in wrestling
Medalists at the 1932 Summer Olympics
20th-century American people